George Larmouth Forrester (8 June 1927 – 25 September 1981) was an English professional footballer. His clubs included Reading and Gillingham, where he made 100 Football League appearances.

References

1927 births
1981 deaths
People from Hednesford
English footballers
West Bromwich Albion F.C. players
Gillingham F.C. players
Reading F.C. players
Ashford United F.C. players
Oxford United F.C. players
British Army personnel of World War II
Kent Football League (1894–1959) players
Association football midfielders